INT 16h, INT 16H or INT 22 is shorthand for BIOS interrupt call 16hex, the 22nd interrupt vector in an x86-based computer system. 
The BIOS typically sets up a real mode interrupt handler at this vector that provides keyboard services. This interruption is responsible for control of the PC keyboard.

Features 

This interruption is responsible for obtaining basic keyboard functionality, i.e. is responsible for collecting the keystrokes, obtain the status of the buffer of keyboard, etc. The standard encoding of the keyboard that offers the INT 16 h is a US keyboard. To adapt the coding of the INT 16h to another type of keyboard (for example, an international keyboard), the code must analyze the scan-code of the key pressed, and then perform suitable interpreting.

For keyboards with 101 letters or more, there are some keys that INT 16h interprets as expanded keys, which have a scan-code that is different from normal keys (e.g., key pause).

List of services of the INT 16 h

INT 16h AH=00h - read keystroke

See also 
 BIOS
 PS/2 port

References

External links 
 explained and complete list of interrupt 16h

BIOS
Interrupts